Neidan, or internal alchemy, is an array of esoteric doctrines and physical, mental, and spiritual practices that Taoist initiates use to prolong life and create an immortal spiritual body that would survive after death. Also known as Jindan ( "golden elixir"), inner alchemy combines theories derived from external alchemy (waidan ), correlative cosmology (including the Five Phases), the emblems of the Yijing, and medical theory, with techniques of Taoist meditation, daoyin gymnastics, and sexual hygiene.

In Neidan the human body becomes a cauldron (or "ding") in which the Three Treasures of Jing ("Essence"), Qi ("Breath") and Shen ("Spirit") are cultivated for the purpose of improving physical, emotional and mental health, and ultimately returning to the primordial unity of the Tao, i.e., attaining Taoist Immortality. It is believed the Xiuzhen Tu is such a cultivation map. In China, it is an important form of practice for most schools of Taoism.

Terminology
The Chinese compound nèidān combines the common word nèi  meaning "inside; inner; internal" with dān  "cinnabar; vermillion; elixir; alchemy". The antonym of nèi is wài  "outside; exterior; external", and nèidān "internal elixir / alchemy" was coined from the earlier complementary term wàidān  "external elixir / alchemy".

Chinese alchemical texts and sources ordinarily call neidan the jīndān dào  or Way of the Golden Elixir. In Modern Standard Chinese usage, the term nèidān shù  (with  "art; skill; technique; method") refers generally to internal alchemical practices.

Many scholars agreed, including Joseph Needham and Lu Gwei-djen who translated Huisi's vow to live as an ascetic in the mountains:
I am seeking for the longevity in order to defend the Faith, not in order to enjoy worldly happiness. I pray that all the saints and sages will come to my help, so that I may get some good magic mushrooms [zhi ], and numinous elixirs [shendan ], enabling me to cure all illnesses and to stop both hunger and thirst. In this way I shall be able to practice continually the way of the Sutras and to engage in the several forms of meditations. I shall hope to find a peaceful dwelling in the depths of the mountains, with enough numinous elixirs and medicine to carry out my plans. Thus, by the aids of external elixirs [waidan] I shall be able to cultivate the elixir within [neidan].
Others believed that neidan first occurred in the biographies of Deng Yuzhi  (fl. 483–493) and Su Yuanming  (fl. c. 600). However, the authenticity of the relevant passages mention above is doubtful.

The term neidan was seldom used throughout the late Tang dynasty (618–907) and Five dynasties (907–960) period, and only became widespread around the beginning of the Song dynasty (960–1279) period, when neidan evolved into a highly complex system in both its theoretical and practical aspects. Tang texts described internal alchemical practices with the words fúyào  "take drug/medicine" and chángshēng  "long life, longevity; (Taoism) eternal life". Liu Xiyue's  988 Taixuan langranzi jindao shi  (Master Taixuan Langran's Poems on Advancing in the Tao) has the earliest datable mention of the terms neidan and waidan. The c. 1019 Yunji Qiqian Taoist anthology mentions the term neidan.

Early texts that mention neidan define it as synonymous or similar with some qi circulation techniques: Cultivation and Transmutation (xiulian ), Embryonic Breathing (taixi ), the Cyclical Elixir (huandan ), the Golden Elixir (jindan ), the Great Elixir (dadan ), the Interior and Exterior Medicines (nei/waiyao ), the Inner and Outer Counterparts (nei/waixiang ), and the Yin Elixir and Yang Elixir (yindan  and yangdan ).

Based upon the textual evidence, Farzeen Baldrian-Hussein concludes that in early texts, neidan refers to a specific technique, and by Song Emperor Zhenzong's reign (997–1022), the term designates a group of techniques, expressed in specific alchemical language.

It is sometimes transliterated using the older Wade–Giles system as Neitan in literature on western Alchemy.

History and development

Neidan is part of the Chinese alchemical meditative tradition that is said to have been separated into internal and external (Waidan) at some point during the Tang dynasty. The Cantong qi (The Kinship of the Three) is the earliest known book on theoretical alchemy in China; it was written by the alchemist Wei Boyang in 142 AD. This text influenced the formation of Neidan, whose earliest existing texts date from the first half of the 8th century. The authors of several Neidan articles refer to their teachings as the Way of the Golden Elixir (jindan zhi dao). The majority of Chinese alchemical sources is found in the Daozang (Taoist Canon), the largest collection of Taoist texts.

Neidan shares a significant portion of its notions and methods with classical Chinese medicine, fangshi and with other bodies of practices, such as meditation and the methods for "nourishing life" (yangsheng). What distinguishes alchemy from these related traditions is its unique view of the elixir as a material or immaterial entity that represents the original state of being and the attainment of that state. The Neidan tradition of internal alchemy is practiced by working with the energies that were already present in the human body as opposed to using natural substances, medicines or elixirs, from outside of the body. The Shangqing School of Taoism played an important role in the emergence of Neidan alchemy, after using Waidan mainly as a meditative practice, and therefore turning it from an external to an internal art.

The Three Treasures

Internal alchemy focuses upon transforming the bodily sanbao "three treasures", which are the essential energies sustaining human life: 
Jing  "nutritive essence, essence; refined, perfected; extract; spirit, demon; sperm, seed"
Qi  "vitality, energy, force; air, vapor; breath; spirit, vigor; attitude"
Shen  "spirit; soul, mind; god, deity; supernatural being"
According to the 13th-century Book of Balance and Harmony:
Making one's essence complete, one can preserve the body. To do so, first keep the body at ease, and make sure there are no desires. Thereby energy can be made complete.
Making one's energy complete, one can nurture the mind. To do so, first keep the mind pure, and make sure there are no thoughts. Thereby spirit can be made complete.
Making one's spirit complete, one can recover emptiness. To do so, first keep the will sincere, and make sure body and mind are united. Thereby spirit can be returned to emptiness. ... To attain immortality, there is nothing else but the refinement of these three treasures: essence, energy, spirit."
When the "three treasures" are internally maintained, along with a balance of yin and yang, it is possible to achieve a healthy body and longevity, which are the main goals of internal alchemy (Ching 1996, 395).

Jing

Jing "essence" referring to the energies of the physical body. Based upon the idea that death was caused by depleting one's jing, Daoist internal alchemy claimed that preserving jing allowed one to achieve longevity, if not immortality.

Qi
Qi or ch'i is defined as the "natural energy of the universe" and manifests in everyone and everything. By means of internal alchemy, Taoists strive to obtain a positive flow of qi through the body in paths moving to each individual organ.

Healing practices such as acupuncture, massage, cupping and herbal medicines are believed to open up the qi meridians throughout the body so that the qi can flow freely. Keeping qi in balance and flowing throughout the body promotes health; imbalance can lead to sickness.

Shen
Shen is the original spirit of the body. Taoists try to become conscious of shen through contemplative practices, including meditation.

See also

 Daoyin
 Bigu (avoiding grains)
 Liu Yiming (1734–1821)
 Neigong
 Neijia
 Neijing Tu
 Qigong

Works cited

.

References

External links
 Daoist Alchemy in the West: The Esoteric Paradigms, Lee Irwin
 "Taoist Alchemy", Fabrizio Pregadio
 The Way of the Golden Elixir: An Introduction to Taoist Alchemy, Fabrizio Pregadio (PDF, free download)
 Secret of the Golden Flower,  Walter Picca 
 An Shigao and Early Chinese Meditation Techniques, Phra Kiattisak Kittipanyo, DIRI Journal 1: 98–118.

Chinese philosophy
Taoist philosophy
Taoist practices
Qigong

de:Neidan